The DBL Sixth Man of the Year is an award that is handed out to the best player that comes off the bench in the Dutch Basketball League, the highest tier of basketball in the Netherlands. The award was handed out for the first time after the 2013–14 season.

Winners

References

Sixth Man of the Year